Beards Creek is an unincorporated community in Long County, in the U.S. state of Georgia.

History
A post office called Beard's Creek was established in 1853, and remained in operation until 1915. The community takes its name from nearby Beards Creek.

References

Unincorporated communities in Long County, Georgia